Studium is a latin word meaning "study", "zeal", "dedication", etc. It may refer to:

 Chavagnes Studium, a center for the study of the Liberal Arts
 Medieval university, a corporation organized during the High Middle Ages
 Studium Angelopolitanum, a non-profit educational organization
 Studium Biblicum Franciscanum, a Franciscan academic society in Jerusalem
 Studium Excitare, a quarterly academic journal
 Studium generale, the customary name for a medieval university
 Studium Generale Marcianum
 Studium monastery, historically the most important monastery of Constantinople

See also 
 
 
 List of medieval universities